This is a list of notable people who are from Newfoundland and Labrador, Canada, or have spent a large part or formative part of their career in that province. This list also includes people associated with the former English, and later British colony of Newfoundland and the dominion of Newfoundland.

A
 Mayra Cervantes, bishop
 Acoutsina, native
 Mike Adam, curler
 William G. Adams, lawyer, politician, judge
 Frederick C. Alderdice, entrepreneur, politician
 Dr. Frederick Allen Aldrich, scientist, educator
 Honourable John Anderson, politician
 Ralph LeMoine Andrews, Order of Canada
 John Bartlett Angel, engineer
 Frank C. Archibald, politician
 Thomas Gordon William Ashbourne, politician
 Charles Robert Ayre, businessman, politician
 Honourable John Bray Ayre, politician
 James Stewart Ayre, politician
 Lewis H.M. Ayre, entrepreneur

B
 George S. Baker, politician
 Honourable James Baird, merchant, Member of Legislative Council
 Charles Ballam, politician
 Rex Barnes, politician
 Robert Bartlett, explorer
 Herman Maxwell Batten, politician
 Charles Fox Bennett, politician
 Jordan Bennett, artist
 David Blackwood, artist
 Eric Blackwood, aviator
 Robert Bond, politician
 Charles R Bowring, merchant, politician
 Frederick Gordon Bradley, politician
 Cyprian Bridge, Royal Navy Officer
 D'Arcy Broderick, musician, singer
 Cassie Brown, author
 Keith Brown, hockey player
 Peter Brown, politician
 William Joseph Browne, politician
 Johnny Burke, songwriter, musician
 Brian Byrne, musician
 Ed Byrne, politician
 Gerry Byrne, politician

C
 Andrew Carnell, politician
 William Carson, entrepreneur, doctor
 Chesley William Carter, politician
 Frederick Carter, governor
 Walter C. Carter, politician
 Michael Patrick Cashin, governor
 Peter John Cashin, politician, entrepreneur, soldier
 Richard Cashin, lawyer, politician, trade union leader
 Robert Chafe, playwright
 Andrew Chatwood, politician
Frederick George Chislett, athlete, entrepreneur
 Daniel Cleary, hockey player (Detroit Red Wings)
 Al Clouston, storyteller, humorist
 Frances Cluett, nurse
 Siobhan Coady, entrepreneur, politician
 William Coaker, trade union leader, politician
 Ethel Cochrane, senator
 Bob Cole, television announcer
 Henry Collingwood, entrepreneur
 Randy Collins, politician
 Ern Condon, politician
 Joan Cook, senator
 Michael Cook, playwright
 William Cormack, Scottish explorer, philanthropist, author
 Charles Cozens, politician
 Mark Critch, comedian
 John Crosbie, lawyer, politician, Lieutenant Governor
 Michael Crummey, writer
 Amy Curlew, ice hockey player

D
 Tom Dawe, writer
 Charles Dawe, politician, merchant
 Demasduwit, aboriginal
 Ethel Dickenson, educator, nurse
 Molly Dingle, educator
 Donald B. Dingwell, scientist, science administrator, educator
 Craig Dobbin, industrialist
 Dermot Dobbin, entrepreneur
 William Doody, politician
 Alan Doyle, singer, musician
 Damhnait Doyle, singer, musician
 Norman Doyle, politician
 Sam Drover, politician
 Karyn Dwyer, actress
 Gwynne Dyer, journalist, syndicated columnist, military historian

E

 John Efford, politician
 Carl English, basketball shooting guard

F
 Fonse Faour, politician
 Alex Faulkner, hockey player (Detroit Red Wings)
Grunia Movschovitch Ferman, entrepreneur, activist
 Adele Fifield, amputee, member Order of Ontario
 Eugene Forsey, politician
James Patrick Fox, politician
 George Furey, politician

G
 Jenny Gear, singer
 Michael Gibbs, lawyer, politician
Deidre Gillard-Rowlings, actress,
 Augustus F. Goodridge, governor
 Armine Nutting Gosling, suffragette
 Rex Goudie, singer
 Charles Granger, politician
 Jason Greeley, singer
 Daniel J. Greene, governor
 Roger Grimes, politician
 Brad Gushue, curler
 Ray Guy (humorist), humorist
 Sandra Gwyn, journalist, writer

H
 Bob Hallett, musician
Violetta Maloney Halpert, folklorist, veteran
 Ewart John Arlington Harnum, lieutenant governor
 Jack Harris, politician
 Jonny Harris, actor/comedian
 Ann Harvey, rescuer
 Kenneth J. Harvey, author, journalist, photographer, filmmaker
 Carolyn Hayward, bullfighter, artist
 Ferd Hayward, athlete, olympian
Ofra Harnoy, concert cellist
 Loyola Hearn, politician
 Albert Hickman, politician, businessman
 Alexander Hickman, lawyer, politician, judge
 General Rick Hillier, Chief of Defense Staff, Canadian Forces
 Harold Horwood, novelist, writer
 Arthur Maxwell House, politician, lieutenant governor
 Danielle House, dethroned beauty queen
Ann Hulan, colonist, entrepreneur, agriculturalist
Gudie Hutchings, politician
 Joel Thomas Hynes, author/actor
 Ron Hynes, singer/songwriter
Thomas Hynes, fisherman, fugitive and protester

J
 Donald Campbell Jamieson, politician
 Sylvester Joe, hunter, explorer
 Morrissey Johnson, politician
 Paul Johnson, philanthropist, businessman
 Wayne Johnston, novelist
 Andy Jones, actor, comedian
 Cathy Jones, actress, comedian

K
 Abram Kean, mariner and sealing captain
 Max Keeping, newscaster and Member of the Order of Canada
 John Kent, politician
 Steve Kent, politician
 Susan Kent, actor and comedian
 Jason King, professional hockey player
Mary Bernard Kirwan, educator, religious leader
 Jamie Korab, curler

L
 Darren Langdon, hockey player
 Walter Learning, actor, director, playwright
 Graham Letto, politician
 Gene Long, politician
 John Howard Lundrigan, politician

M
 Kevin Major, children's author
 Shaun Majumder, comedian, actor
 Greg Malone, impressionist, actor
 Sean McCann, musician
 Desmond McGrath, priest, trade union organizer, politician
 James McGrath, politician, lieutenant governor
 Alexander James Whiteford McNeilly, politician, lawyer
 Rick Mercer, comedian
 Fred J. Mifflin, Rear Admiral, politician
 Mattie Mitchell, Mi’kmaq Chieftain, guide, prospector, and explorer
 Walter Stanley Monroe, governor
 Lisa Moore, writer
 Rob Moore, politician, lawyer
 Frank Moores, politician
 Patrick Moran, musician
 Bernice Morgan, novelist
 Moses Morgan, academic, Order of Canada
 Francis Morris, politician, lawyer and judge
 Donna Morrissey, author
 John Joseph Murphy, politician, businessman
 Rex Murphy, journalist
 Alexander Murray, geologist
 Hilda Chaulk Murray, author

N
 Alex Newhook, NHL hockey player
 Mark Nichols, curler
 Walter Noel, politician
 Dick Nolan, singer, songwriter, guitarist 
 Nonosbawsut, chief, aboriginal
 Peg Norman, politician, abortion activist, lesbian activist
 Calvin Normore, Philosophy professor
 Dwayne Norris, NHL, Olympic Hockey Player
 Warren Norris, AHL Hockey Player 
 Joseph W. Noseworthy, politician

O
 Lawrence D. O'Brien, politician
 Fergus O'Byrne, musician
 Brian O'Dea, criminal
 Joseph Phillip O'Keefe, politician
 Seamus O'Regan, politician and former television personality; ex-host of Canada AM

P
 William Anthony Paddon, Lieutenant-Governor
 Jean Payne, politician
 Jim Payne, folk singer
 Brian Peckford, politician
 Mark Peddle, musician
John Peyton, fisherman
 Gordon Pinsent, actor
 Robert John Pinsent, magistrate, judge
 Al Pittman, writer
Helen Fogwill Porter, author, activist
 Greg Power, politician, farmer, poet, athlete
 James Power, politician
Tom Power, broadcaster, musician
 Christopher Pratt, artist, painter
 E. J. Pratt, poet
 Joseph Price, politician
 Daniel Woodley Prowse, lawyer, politician

Q
 Herman William Quinton, senator

R
 Ian Angus Ross Reid, politician
 Robert Gillespie Reid, railway contractor
 Thomas Ricketts, soldier, Victoria Cross
 Thomas Rideout, politician
 Edward Roberts, politician, lieutenant governor
 Gordon Rodgers, writer
 Gerry Rogers, filmmaker, politician
Isabella Whiteford Rogerson, poet, philanthropist
 Bill Rompkey, politician, senator
 Frederick Russell, businessman, former lieutenant governor
 Kelly Russell, Musician 
 Ted Russell, author, playwright, comedian
 Todd Russell, politician
 James M. Ryan, businessman
 Terry Ryan, NHL hockey player
 Michael Ryder, NHL hockey player

S
 Tommy Sexton, actor
 Shanawdithit, aboriginal
 Craig Sharpe, singer
 Ambrose Shea, politician
 George Shea, politician
 Roger Simmons, politician
 Scott Simms, politician
 Joey Smallwood, politician
 Catherine Mandeville Snow, last woman hanged in NL
 Rod Snow, Canadian Rugby International
 Squanto, Indigenous historical figure
 Gerald Squires, artist
 Richard Squires, politician
 Const. Frank Stamp, policeman, boxer
 Geoff Stirling, businessman
 Georgina Stirling, opera singer
 Loyola Sullivan, politician

T
 William Taverner, plantation owner, surveyor
 Myra Louise Taylor, nurse
 William Thomas, politician
 Greg Thomey, comedian
 Brian Tobin, politician
Mary Widdicombe Travers, hotelier 
 James Roy Tucker, politician
Otto Tucker, author, educator
 Beaton Tulk, politician
 Tracy Tweed, actress, Playboy model

U
 Abraham Ulrikab, aboriginal

W
 Tracey Waddleton, writer
 Michael Walker, economist
 Agnes Walsh, poet, playwright, oral historian
 Albert Walsh, commissioner, chief justice and Lieutenant-Governor of Newfoundland, 1949
 William Warren, lawyer, politician, judge
 Andy Wells, politician
 Clyde Wells, politician
 Ed "Sailor" White, wrestler, politician
 Minnie White, accordionist
 Danny Williams, politician
 Harold (Hank) Williams, geologist
 Percival Willoughby, land owner
 Gordon Arnaud Winter, lieutenant governor
 James Spearman Winter, politician, premier
 Michael Winter, writer

See also

 List of people from St. John's, Newfoundland and Labrador
 List of communities in Newfoundland and Labrador
 Dictionary of Canadian Biography
 List of Canadians
 List of Canadian painters
 List of Canadians by net worth
 List of Mauriciens
 List of Irish Quebecers